Pedro Luís Guido Scarpa (7 February 1925 – 20 October 2018) was an Italian Catholic bishop who served in Angola.

Biography 
Scarpa was born in Italy and was ordained to the priesthood on 26 March 1950. He served as titular bishop of Korčula' and as auxiliary bishop of the Roman Catholic Archdiocese of Luanda, Angola from 1983 to 1990. He then served as bishop of the Roman Catholic Diocese of Ndalatando, Angola, from 1990 to 2005. Scarpa died on 20 October 2018 at the age of 93.

Notes

1925 births
2018 deaths
Capuchin bishops
20th-century Roman Catholic bishops in Angola
21st-century Roman Catholic bishops in Angola
Italian Roman Catholic bishops in Africa
Italian expatriates in Angola
Roman Catholic bishops of Ndalatando
Clergy from Venice